David Horowitz (born 1939) is a conservative activist and political writer.

David Horowitz may also refer to:
 David Horowitz (economist) (1899–1979), first governor of the Bank of Israel
 David Horowitz (author) (1903–2002), founder of the United Israel World Union
 David Horowitz (consumer advocate) (1937–2019), American consumer advocate

See also
David Hurwitz (disambiguation)